Koolewong railway station is located on the Main Northern line in New South Wales, Australia. It serves the southern Central Coast suburb of Koolewong opening on 29 November 1920.

Koolewong was originally known as "Glenrock" but the name Koolewong was selected by the NSW Railways and the locality subsequently also became known as Koolewong.

Platforms and services
Koolewong has two side platforms. It is serviced by NSW TrainLink Central Coast & Newcastle Line services travelling from Sydney Central to Newcastle. Platform 1 is about 4 cars long and platform 2 is about 2 cars long.

Transport links
Busways operate two routes via Koolewong station:
55: Gosford station to Ettalong Beach
70: Gosford Hospital to Ettalong Beach

References

External links

Koolewong station details Transport for New South Wales

Transport on the Central Coast (New South Wales)
Railway stations in Australia opened in 1920
Regional railway stations in New South Wales
Short-platform railway stations in New South Wales, 2 cars
Short-platform railway stations in New South Wales, 4 cars
Main North railway line, New South Wales